Roderick Cox is a Germany-based American conductor. In 2018 he won the Sir Georg Solti Conductor award, the largest of its kind for an American conductor. Recent performances include Boston, Cincinnati, and New World symphonies as well as Detroit Symphony and Minnesota orchestras, Seattle Symphony, and Aspen Musical Festival Chamber Orchestra. Cox has made debuts with Houston Grand Opera and San Francisco Opera and recorded Jeannine Tesori's Blue with Washington National Opera. Upcoming highlights include debuts with the Philadelphia Orchestra and Mostly Mozart Festival Orchestra, City of Birmingham Symphony Orchestra, Royal Liverpool Philharmonic, and Barcelona Symphony, as well as his return to the Los Angeles and BBC philharmonics.  He formerly served as associate conductor of the Minnesota Orchestra, a position he was appointed to in September 2016 after serving as assistant conductor for a year.

Biography 
Cox was born in Macon, Georgia. He attended the Schwob School of Music at Columbus State University, and then later attended and graduated from Northwestern University with a master's degree in conducting in 2011. During his time at Northwestern, he studied conducting with Russian maestro Victor Yampolsky and acclaimed conducting pedagogue Mallory Thompson. Cox then went on to further his studies with Robert Spano at the American Academy of Conducting in Aspen, Colorado in 2013 and 2014

Career 
Cox conducted the Northwestern University's various classical ensembles including the university's symphony orchestra. Cox was an assistant conductor with the Alabama Symphony Orchestra after graduating from Northwestern University. He became the music director and principal conductor of the Alabama Symphony Youth Orchestra in 2012. He won the Robert J. Harth Conducting Prize in 2013. In 2015, Cox began working as assistant conductor in the Minnesota Orchestra, followed by the position of associate conductor in 2016. He debuted his subscription concert series in January 2017. After leaving the Minnesota Orchestra in 2018 Cox moved to Berlin, Germany. 

Cox has been described by the Santa Fe New Mexican as having a "fluid conducting style."

He launched the Roderick Cox Music Initiative (RCMI) in 2019. RCMI provides scholarships for young musicians from historically marginalized communities, allowing them to pay for instruments, music lessons, and summer camps. Cox and his initiative were featured in the documentary "Conducting Life." https://roderickcox.com

References

External links 
 Roderick Cox, conducting compilation (video)

Living people
People from Macon, Georgia
Columbus State University alumni
Northwestern University alumni
Year of birth missing (living people)